Lichty Guitars is an American company based in Tryon, North Carolina, that has been making custom acoustic guitars and ukuleles since 2009. It was founded by musician Jay Lichty, who honed his craft with luthier Wayne Henderson.

History 
Jay Lichty was previously a homebuilder and carpenter, but as the housing market declined, he began producing guitars, eventually making his luthier company his primary career by 2009. Within the first year of business, Lichty Guitars experienced a steady stream of custom orders and a Garden & Gun magazine award naming Lichty Guitars the overall winner of the "Made in the South" awards.

Jay Lichty creates all the instruments by hand using a wide variety of domestic and exotic hardwoods including Indian rosewood, Brazilian rosewood, pau ferro, cocobolo, lacewood, hormigo, koa, mahogany, ziricote, ancient kauri, maple, claro walnut and others for the instrument bodies. Types of wood used for the soundboards include lutz, engelmann, sitka, Adirondack spruces, Western red cedar, sinker redwood, koa, and mahogany.

A collaboration with Raleigh, North Carolina artist Clark Hipolito led to a series of handmade hand-painted guitars and ukuleles.

Jay Lichty offers one-on-one guitar building workshops and small group classes. He is a member of the Guild of American Luthiers (GAL) and the Association of Stringed Instrument Artisans (ASIA).

Awards 
Lichty Guitars was the overall winner in Garden & Gun magazine's "Made in the South" competition in 2010.

Designs

Acoustic guitars 

 Dreadnought Guitar - A square-shouldered, deep-bodied guitar, the dreadnought is a contemporary interpretation of the most popular steel string guitar design. The quality of the dreadnought sound is full, balanced and powerful with deep bass registers.
 OM Guitar - The OM (Orchestra Model) style is a favorite of fingerstyle soloists as well as guitarists with a wide range of playing styles. The Lichty OM has a 14 fret neck, a smaller body than the dreadnought and sloping shoulders. The Lichty OM is known for its responsive playability and for producing balanced crystal clear notes from one end of the scale to other. Unlike the dreadnought, the bass register does not dominate. 
 Alchemist - The Alchemist features distinctive body lines with an OM-style size, a wedge-shaped body (inspired by the innovations of Linda Manzer) a side sound port, extended fretboard, bound fretboard and headstock and Gotoh 510 tuners.
 Parlor Guitar - The smaller body size and design of the parlor guitar allows for a balance of frequencies.
 Crossover Guitar - A melding of a classical and a steel string guitar, the Crossover has the body and bracing of a Ramirez classical coupled with a radius fretboard and a 1-7/8″ nut width. Classical guitars typically have a 2″ to 2-1/4″ nut width and steel string guitars are 1-11/16″ to 1-13/16″. Lichty added a truss rod, a body cutaway and a side sound port (both optional), as well as a K&K Classic pickup and nylon strings.

Ukuleles 
 Tenor Ukulele - A popular choice for performing soloists, the tenor is larger than the concert and soprano size, and therefore produces greater volume and a more complex tone than smaller ukuleles. Its larger size also makes it an easier adaption for guitar players. 
 Baritone Ukulele - The baritone is the largest of the ukulele sizes and produces the deepest sound. Given its size and tuning (often the same as the bottom four strings of the guitar), it is favored by many guitar players as a cross-over instrument to expand their playing experience.

References

External links

 Video: "Made from Wood: The Art of Acoustic Guitar Building," an Eric Olsen short film

Companies based in North Carolina
Ukulele makers
Guitar manufacturing companies of the United States